The Relation of Face, Mind and Love is a 2009 South Korean-Japanese film starring Kang Ji-hwan and Lee Ji-ah. The romantic comedy film ponders the classic question of how much looks matter when it comes to love, when a good-looking architect finds the perfect woman, except for the fact that she is not very pretty.

It was part of the "Telecinema7" project, seven feature-length mini-dramas which were collaborations between South Korean TV directors and Japanese TV screenwriters; the seven Korea-Japan joint productions both received a limited theater release and were broadcast on television. The Relation of Face, Mind and Love was first released in Korea in CGV theaters on November 5, 2009, and later aired on SBS (South Korea) on April 4, 2010, and TV Asahi (Japan) in 2010.

Alternate titles are My Love, Ugly Duckling and Oh My Venus.

Plot
Kang Tae-poong is a handsome and successful architect who constantly emphasizes the importance of substance over style in architecture, but has yet to apply this philosophy when it comes to love. Until one day, after a minor car accident, he suddenly suffers from a "temporary visual impairment" that makes beauties appear ugly and vice versa. When an inebriated and hot-tempered Wang So-jung passes out in front of Tae-poong's office building, he sees her as the beautiful resurrection of his dead fiancée and falls head over heels. Ugly duckling So-jung is completely baffled when Tae-poong keeps calling her his "goddess," but she soon makes him fall in love with her for her true charms, like how she is humble and unafraid to be goofy. Tae-poong's eye problem is fixed, however, by the time So-jung returns from a business trip a few days later, and when they meet again, he fails to recognize her.

Cast
Kang Ji-hwan - Kang Tae-poong 
Lee Ji-ah - Wang So-jung
Lee Dong-hoon - Eun-soo, doctor
Hwang Jung-eum - Eun-bin
Jeon Soo-kyung - Editor
Hwang Bo-ra - Tae-young
Kang Chan-yang - Lee Ha-na, Eun-soo's wife
Park No-shik - taxi driver
Yoon Mi-kyung - blind date woman 1
Son Ga-young - aircrew 
Sung Joon  - younger doctor

See also
Heaven's Postman
19-Nineteen
Triangle
Paradise
After the Banquet
A Dream Comes True

References

External links
 https://web.archive.org/web/20130624215141/http://telecinema7.jp/ 
 http://cafe.naver.com/telecine7/ 
 The Relation of Face, Mind and Love at Samhwa Networks
 Oh My Venus at CJ Entertainment
 
 
 

2009 films
South Korean romantic comedy films
2009 romantic comedy films
Japanese romantic comedy films
2000s Japanese films
2000s South Korean films